Mr. & Mrs. Smith may refer to: 

 Mr. & Mrs. Smith (1941 film), an American comedy directed by Alfred Hitchcock
 Mr. & Mrs. Smith (TV series), a short-lived American crime drama series airing on the CBS network in 1996
 Mr. & Mrs. Smith (2005 film), an American action-comedy film starring Brad Pitt and Angelina Jolie
 Mr. & Mrs. Smith (2022 TV series), an upcoming television series based on the 2005 film
 "Mr. & Mrs. Smith" (song), a 2012 song in the musical TV series Smash
 "Mr and Mrs Smith", a song by Stereophonics on their 2015 album Keep the Village Alive

See also
 Mr and Mrs Smith and Mr Drake, a 1984 album by Cardiacs